The Journal of Technical Writing and Communication is a quarterly peer-reviewed academic journal covering the diverse communication needs of industry, management, government, and academia, including audience analysis, online documentation, technical journalism, and research into communication within interdisciplinary fields. It was established in 1971 and is published by SAGE Publications. The journal's editor is Charles H. Sides (Fitchburg State University).

Abstracting and indexing 
The journal is abstracted and indexed in EBSCO databases, ERIC and Scopus.

References

External links 

SAGE Publishing academic journals
Communication journals
Quarterly journals
Publications established in 1971
English-language journals